Germany entered the Eurovision Song Contest 1992 with "Träume sind für alle da" by Wind, after they won the German national final. It was called "Ein Lied für Malmö" (A song for Malmö). The song was composed by Ralph Siegel and Bernd Meinunger. 

Wind had previously represented Germany at the 1985 and 1987 contests with "Für alle" and "Laß die Sonne in dein Herz", coming second both times.

Before Eurovision

Ein Lied für Malmö 
The German broadcaster for Eurovision, Mitteldeutscher Rundfunk (MDR) (part of ARD) held a national final to select the German entry to the Eurovision Song Contest 1992, held in Malmö, Sweden. 

The final took place on 30 March 1992 at the Rotehornhalle in Magdeburg, hosted by Carmen Nebel. The winner was selected by the votes of regional juries located in the eleven regional ARD broadcasters who each voted for their favourite song. Each jury region consisted of ten television viewers who awarded each song from 1 to 3 points. The entry with the most points received 1 vote.

At Eurovision
Wind performed 22nd on the night of the contest, following Norway and preceding the Netherlands. "Träume sind für alle da" received 27 points, placing 16th of 23 countries competing.

Voting

References

External links
German National Final 1992

1992
Countries in the Eurovision Song Contest 1992
Eurovision
Eurovision